The National Registry of Evidence-based Programs and Practices (NREPP) was a searchable online database of interventions designed to promote mental health or to prevent or treat substance abuse and mental disorders. The registry was funded and administered by the Substance Abuse and Mental Health Services Administration (SAMHSA), part of the U.S. Department of Health and Human Services. The goal of the Registry was to encourage wider adoption of evidence-based interventions and to help those interested in implementing an evidence-based intervention to select one that best meets their needs.

The NREPP website was phased out in 2018. See the section below about the phase out for more information.

Overview 
In the behavioral health field, there is an ongoing need for researchers, developers, evaluators, and practitioners to share information about what works to improve outcomes among individuals coping with, or at risk for, mental disorders and substance abuse. Discussing how this need led to the development of NREPP, Brounstein, Gardner, and Backer (2006) write:

The focus of NREPP is on delivering an array of standardized, comparable information on interventions that are evidence based, as opposed to identifying programs that are "effective" or ranking them in effectiveness. Its peer reviewers use specific criteria to rate the quality of an intervention's evidence base as well as the intervention's suitability for broad adoption. In addition, NREPP provides contextual information about the intervention, such as the population served, implementation history, and cost data to encourage a realistic and holistic approach to selecting prevention interventions.

As of 2010, the interventions reviewed by NREPP have been implemented successfully in more than 229,000 sites, in all 50 States and more than 70 countries, and with more than 107 million clients.  Versions of ura review process and rating criteria have been adopted by the National Cancer Institute and the Administration on Aging.

The information NREPP provides is subject to certain limitations. It is not an exhaustive repository of all tested mental health interventions; submission is a voluntary process, and limited resources may preclude the review of some interventions even though they meet minimum requirements for acceptance. The NREPP home page prominently states that "inclusion in the registry does not constitute an endorsement."

Submission process 
NREPP holds an open submission period that runs November 1 through February 1. For an intervention to be eligible for a review, it must meet four minimum criteria:
 The intervention has produced one or more positive behavioral outcomes (p ≤ .05) in mental health, mental disorders, substance abuse, or substance use disorders use among individuals, communities, or populations.
 Evidence of these outcomes has been demonstrated in at least one study using an experimental or quasi-experimental design.
 The results of these studies have been published in a peer-reviewed journal or other professional publication, or documented in a comprehensive evaluation report.
 Implementation materials, training and support resources, and quality assurance procedures have been developed and are ready for use by the public.

Once reviewed and added to the Registry, interventions are invited to undergo a new review four or five years after their initial review.

Review process 
The NREPP review process consists of two parallel and simultaneous review tracks, one that looks at the intervention's Quality of Research (QOR) and another that looks at the intervention's Readiness for Dissemination (RFD). The materials used in a QOR review are generally published research articles, although unpublished final evaluation reports can also be included. The materials used in an RFD review include implementation materials and process documentation, such as manuals, curricula, training materials, and written quality assurance procedures.

The reviews are conducted by expert consultants who have received training on NREPP's review process and rating criteria. Two QOR and two RFD reviewers are assigned to each review. Reviewers work independently, rating the same materials. Their ratings are averaged to generate final scores.

While the review process is ongoing, NREPP staff work with the intervention's representatives to collect descriptive information about the intervention, such as the program goals, types of populations served, and implementation history.

The QOR ratings, given on a scale of 0.0 to 4.0, indicate the strength of the evidence supporting the outcomes of the intervention. Higher scores indicate stronger, more compelling evidence. Each outcome is rated separately because interventions may target multiple outcomes (e.g., alcohol use, marijuana use, behavior problems in school), and the evidence supporting the different outcomes may vary. The QOR rating criteria are:

 Reliability of measures
 Validity of measures
 Intervention fidelity
 Missing data and attrition
 Potential confounding variables
 Appropriateness of analysis

The RFD ratings, also given on a scale of 0.0 to 4.0, indicate the amount and quality of the resources available to support the use of the intervention. Higher scores indicate that resources are readily available and of high quality. These ratings apply to the intervention as a whole. The RFD criteria are:

 Availability of implementation materials
 Availability of training and support resources
 Availability of quality assurance procedures

Reviewers 
QOR reviewers are required to have a doctoral-level degree and a strong background and understanding of current methods of evaluating prevention and treatment interventions. RFD reviewers are selected from two categories: direct services experts (including both providers and consumers of services), or experts in the field of implementation. Direct services experts must have previous experience evaluating prevention or treatment interventions and knowledge of mental health or substance abuse prevention or treatment content areas.

Products and publications 
NREPP publishes an intervention summary for each intervention it adds to the Registry. The summaries, which are accessed through the Registry's search engine, contain the following standardized information:

 A brief description of the reviewed intervention, including targeted goals and theoretical basis
 Study populations (age, gender, race/ethnicity)
 Study settings and geographical locations 
 Implementation history
 Funding information
 Comparative evaluation research conducted with the intervention
 Adaptations
 Adverse effects
 List of studies and materials reviewed
 List of outcomes
 Description of measures and key findings for each outcome
 Research design of the studies reviewed
 Quality of Research and Readiness for Dissemination ratings
 Reviewer comments (Strengths and Weaknesses)
 Costs
 Replication studies
 Contact information

NREPP also maintains an online Learning Center. Offerings include learning modules on implementation and preparing for NREPP submission; a research paper on evidence-based therapy relationships; and links to screening and assessment tools for mental health and substance use.

Predecessor system 
The registry originated in 1997 and has gone through several changes since then. The predecessor to today's NREPP was the National Registry of Effective Prevention Programs (later renamed the National Registry of Effective Programs and Practices), which was developed by SAMHSA's Center for Substance Abuse Prevention as part of the Model Programs initiative. Procedures under this earlier registry were developed to review, rate, and designate programs as Model, Effective, or Promising. Based on extensive input from scientific communities, service providers, expert panels, and the public, the procedures were revised. Reviews using the new NREPP system began in 2006, and the redesigned Web site debuted in March 2007.

Phase out in 2018

According to an email from SAMHSA:

"SAMHSA is committed to advancing the adoption of evidence-based interventions related to mental health and substance use. Consistent with the January 2018 announcement from the Assistant Secretary for Mental Health and Substance Use related to discontinuing the National Registry of Evidence-based Programs and Practices (NREPP), SAMHSA has now phased out the NREPP website, which has been in existence since 1997. In April 2018, SAMHSA launched the Evidence-Based Practices Resource Center (Resource Center) that aims to provide communities, clinicians, policy makers, and others in the field with the information and tools they need to incorporate evidence-based practices into their communities or clinical settings. The Resource Center contains a collection of science-based resources; however, it does not replace NREPP and does not contain all of the resources that were previously available on NREPP.

"The Resource Center is a component of SAMHSA’s new comprehensive approach to identify and disseminate clinically sound and scientifically based policy, practices, and programs. Under this new approach, we are continuing to develop and add additional resources to the Resource Center as they become available.  In the meantime, please use our Resource Center as well as the SAMHSA Store to find information on evidence-based practices and other resources related to mental health and substance use. For products and resources not developed by SAMHSA, please contact the developers for more information."

Further reading
 Hennessy, K., Finkbiner, R., & Hill, G. (2006). "The National Registry of Evidence-Based Programs and Practices: A decision-support tool to advance the use of evidence-based services". International Journal of Mental Health, 35(2), 21–34. doi: 10.2753/IMH0020-7411350202.  
 Brounstein, P. J., Gardner, S. E., & Backer, T. (2006). "Research to practice: Efforts to bring effective prevention to every community". Journal of Primary Prevention, 27(1), 91–109. doi: 10.1007/s10935-005-0024-6. . These criteria and the accompanying rating anchors are unique to NREPP but share common elements with the types of standards used by other Federal agencies to assess evidence-based programs.

External links 
 Official Web site - phased out in 2018
SAMHSA Evidence-Based Practices Resource Center
 Substance Abuse and Mental Health Services (SAMHSA)

References 

Counseling
Drug rehabilitation
Evidence-based practices
Online databases